

Presidential elections

National Assembly Elections 

Pyrénées-Atlantiques returns 6 members to the National Assembly

5th Republic Representatives

Pyrénées-Atlantiques - 6 seats

References 

Senators of Pyrénées-Atlantiques
Pyrénées-Atlantiques